Chocolate is a 2019–2020 Tamil-language soap opera starring Priyanka Kumar, Rahul Ravi, and Vandana Brundha. It premiered on  Sun TV from 16 December 2019 replacing Mahalakshmi serial. The show is produced by Vision Time India Pvt Ltd and directed by K Venpa Kadhiresan. It is the official remake of the Surya TV's Malayalam serial Chocolate. The show is re-telecasting from September 20, 2021, onwards at 3:30 PM (Indian Standard Time).

Synopsis
Chocolate is the story of Vikram and Iniya. Vikram is a wealthy businessman, and Iniya is an ordinary girl with an extraordinary talent for baking mouthwatering dark chocolate cookies. Circumstances force her to quit baking until she cross-paths with Vikram.

Cast

Main
 Priyanka as Iniya: Vikram's wife
Rahul Ravi as Vikram: Iniya's husband
 Vandana Brundha as Pallavi

Recurring
 Mamilla Shailaja Priya as Renuka: Vikram's mother
 Abhishek Shankar as Sanjay Kumar: Vikram's father
 Akshitha Ashok as Vaishali: Vikram's younger sister
 Ravikumar as Narayanan; Vikram's paternal grandfather
 Gayathri Priya as Sivagami: Iniya's mother
 Sathish as Vasudevan: Iniya's father
 Rithika Tamil Selvi as Amrudha aka Ammu: Iniya's  younger sister
 Swapna as Ramya: Vikram's paternal aunt
 Moses R Wilky as Ramesh: Vikram's paternal uncle 
 Vignesh Reddy as Rahul: Vikram's paternal cousin brother 
 Bhanuprakash as Pallavi's father
 Kiran and Gve Krishna as Siddharth aka Siddhu: Vikram's paternal cousin brother 
 Vishwanathan as Vishwanathan: Vikram's office worker
 Vicky Roshan as Kumaravel aka Kumaran: Iniya's maternal cousin; Parvathi's son
 Rekha Suresh as Parvathi: Kumaran's mother; Vasudevan's sister; Iniya's maternal aunt
 Hensha Deepan as Sumathi: Kumaran's wife

Special appearance
 Chef Damodharan as himself

Adaptations

Production
Initially aired during afternoons from Monday to Saturday, in March 2020, it was shifted to a night slot.

Rahul Ravi played the lead role of Vikram in the Malayalam version of the series. However, he also joined the lead for this Tamil version as Vikram and he worked for both the series. However, due to work schedule conflict,  he was replaced by Bipin Jose in the Malayalam series.

References

Sun TV original programming
Tamil-language romance television series
2010s Tamil-language television series
2019 Tamil-language television series debuts
Tamil-language television shows
2020 Tamil-language television series endings